Albert Lea is a city in Freeborn County, in southern Minnesota. It is the county seat. Its population was 18,492 at the 2020 census.

It is on the shores of Fountain Lake, Pickerel Lake, Albert Lea Lake, Goose Lake, School Lake, and Lake Chapeau. Fountain Lake and Albert Lea Lake are part of the Shell Rock River flowage.

The city's early growth was based on agriculture, farming support services and manufacturing, and it was a significant rail center. At one time it was the site of Cargill's headquarters. Other manufacturing included Edwards Manufacturing (barn equipment), Scotsman Ice Machines, Streater Store fixtures, and Universal Milking Machines. As in many U.S. cities, Albert Lea's manufacturing base has substantially diminished. A major employer was the Wilson & Company meatpacking plant, later known as Farmstead and Farmland. This facility was destroyed by fire in July 2001.

History

The city is named after Albert Miller Lea, a topographer with the United States Dragoons, who surveyed southern Minnesota and northern Iowa in 1835, including the current site of Albert Lea. Captain Nathan Boone, a son of Daniel Boone, was the scout for Lea's unit.

The city received national attention in 1959 after Local 6 of the United Packinghouse Workers of America went on strike against Wilson & Co., one of the Big Four meatpacking plants at the time, over issues involving mandatory overtime requirements. When Wilson & Co. attempted to operate the plant with replacement workers, violence erupted and split the town. During the 109-day strike, Governor Orville Freeman acted to quell the violence by closing the plant, calling in the Minnesota National Guard, and declaring martial law on December 11. A federal district court in Minneapolis ruled against Freeman on December 23, and the plant turned back to Wilson & Co. just days later.

Geography
Myre-Big Island State Park is nearby. There are three main lakes in Albert Lea: Fountain Lake, Pickerel Lake and Albert Lea Lake. 

Known as "The Land Between the Lakes," Albert Lea has three main lakes: Fountain Lake, Albert Lea Lake, and Pickerel Lake. Fish typically found in these lakes include bullhead, carp, northern pike, bass, walleye, catfish, yellow perch, and various panfish. The lakes offer boating, fishing, canoeing, and boat tours.

Climate
Albert Lea has a humid continental climate of the hot-summer subtype (Köppen Dfa).  Albert Lea varies from cold winters to hot summers, with significant contrasts between seasons. Its climate type is typical for inland northern United States locations, but due to its southern position in the state, its summers and winters have higher temperatures than other, more northerly regions of the state.  An exception to this rule is the urban core of Minneapolis - St. Paul, which sees higher temperatures typical of an urban heat island, but Albert Lea is significantly warmer than locations such as Duluth.

Demographics

2010 census
As of the census of 2010, there were 18,016 people, 7,774 households, and 4,644 families living in the city. The racial makeup of the city was 90.0% White, 1.1% African American, 0.3% Native American, 1.1% Asian, 0.1% Pacific Islander, 5.3% from other races, and 2.1% from two or more races. Hispanic or Latino of any race were 13.2% of the population.

There were 7,774 households, of which 25.6% had children under the age of 18 living with them, 45.0% were married couples living together, 10.4% had a female householder with no husband present, 4.4% had a male householder with no wife present, and 40.3% were non-families. 34.9% of all households were made up of individuals, and 17.3% had someone living alone who was 65 years of age or older. The average household size was 2.24 and the average family size was 2.85.

The median age in the city was 44 years. 21.5% of residents were under the age of 18; 7.9% were between the ages of 18 and 24; 22% were from 25 to 44; 26.3% were from 45 to 64; and 22.4% were 65 years of age or older. The gender makeup of the city was 48.3% male and 51.7% female.

2000 census
As of the census of 2000, there were 18,356 people, 7,785 households, and 4,826 families living in the city. The racial makeup of the city was 92.80% White, 0.37% African American, 0.29% Native American, 0.80% Asian, 0.03% Pacific Islander, 4.54% from other races, and 1.18% from two or more races.  9.48% of the population were Hispanic or Latino of any race.

Of the 7,785 households, 26.9% had children under the age of 18 living with them, 49.5% were married couples living together, 9.1% had a female householder with no husband present, and 38.0% were non-families. 33.0% of all households were made up of individuals, and 16.8% had someone living alone who was 65 years of age or older.  The average household size was 2.28 and the average family size was 2.88.

23.0% of Albert Lea's population were under the age of 18, 7.9% were 18 to 24, 24.6% were 25 to 44, 23.2% were from 45 to 64, and 21.3% were 65 years of age or older.  The median age was 41 years. For every 100 females, there were 90.2 males.  For every 100 females age 18 and over, there were 87.6 males.

The median income for a household in the city was $32,841, and the median income for a family was $42,407. Males had a median income of $31,383 versus $21,114 for females. The per capita income for the city was $17,979.  10.2% of the population and 6.9% of families were below the poverty line.   10.6% of those under the age of 18 and 10.9% of those 65 and older were living below the poverty line.

Arts and culture

The Marion Ross Performing Arts Center is a historic building in downtown Albert Lea. The 255-seat theater is used for the arts, business meetings, and seminars.

A county fair takes place annually in Albert Lea, and includes live entertainment, an antique tractor show, a draft horse show, a small and baby animal show, and a Sunday church service. 

The Albert Lea Art Center hosts public events.

Sports
The Albert Lea Thunder was a junior hockey team that played at Albert Lea Ice Arena and was a member of the North American Hockey League. The team operated for two seasons in 2008–10 and folded due to financial difficulties. On May 11, 2010, it was reported that the team had found new owners and would relocate to Texas for the 2010–11 season. Its roster was sold to the expansion Amarillo, Texas, franchise the Amarillo Bulls on May 26, 2010.

Government
Albert Lea's city hall is at 221 East Clark St. Albert Lea is in Minnesota's 1st congressional district, represented by Brad Finstad, a Republican from New Ulm. It is in Minnesota State Senate District 27, represented by State Senator Gene Dornink, a Republican from Hayfield, and in Minnesota's House District 27A, represented by Peggy Bennett, a Republican.

Education
School District 241
Alternative Learning Center
Elementary schools
Halverson Elementary
Hawthorne Elementary
Lakeview Elementary
Sibley Elementary
St. Theodore's Catholic School
Middle schools
Southwest Middle School
High school
Albert Lea High School
Higher education
Riverland Community College
Lea College, operated 1966–1973
Community education
Albert Lea Community Ed

Media
The Albert Lea Tribune, founded in 1897, is a newspaper published Monday through Saturday in Albert Lea. It is owned by Boone Newspapers.

Radio stations with Albert Lea as the city of license include:

 KATE an AM radio station broadcasting at 1450 kHz. The station airs news/talk programming and is owned by Alpha Media.
 KCPI "94.9 The Breeze" an FM radio station broadcasting at 94.9 MHz. The station airs an adult contemporary music programming and is owned by Alpha Media.
 KQPR "Power 96" an FM radio station broadcasting at 96.1 MHz. The station airs classic rock music programming and is owned by D&Z Media LLC.

Notable people
 Clare Hibbs Armstrong, brigadier general during World War II
 Alfred Berglund, Minnesota state senator and farmer
 Beatrice Gjertsen Bessesen (1886–1935), operatic soprano and namesake of the Bessesen Building on the National Register of Historic Places listings in Minnesota
 Tom Brown (Canadian football), Minnesota Golden Gophers and BC Lions football star; 1960 Outland Trophy winner and Heisman Trophy runner-up; College Football Hall of Fame and Canadian Football Hall of Fame inductee
 Richard Carlson, sci-fi and horror, writer, director and actor, best known for Creature from the Black Lagoon
 Vinny Cerrato, former Washington Redskins general manager
 Eddie Cochran, rockabilly musician (composer of "Summertime Blues" and "Twenty Flight Rock")
 Robert Crumb, cartoonist and musician. His family often moved between Philadelphia and Albert Lea, his father Charles's hometown
 Richard Fitzgerald, farmer, businessman, and Minnesota state legislator
 Al Franken, comedian, commentator and U.S. Senator, attended Hawthorne Elementary and Abbott Elementary
 Joan Claire Graham, writer, editor and publisher
 Alexander Grinager, an artist most noted for his murals, born in Albert Lea
 Rudolph Hanson, lawyer and Minnesota state legislator
 Steve Heitzeg, composer, born in Albert Lea
 Mary Kelly, conceptual artist
 John A. Lovely, Minnesota Supreme Court justice
 Paul Overgaard, businessman and Minnesota state legislator
 Tim Penny, U.S. Representative (1983–1995), born in Albert Lea
 Mark Piepho, businessman and Minnesota state legislator
 Marion Ross, actress (Happy Days); the town's civic theater was renamed the Marion Ross Performing Arts Center
 Perry Saturn, professional wrestler
 Warren Stowell, teacher, businessman, and Minnesota state legislator

See also
Albert Lea Municipal Airport
Albert Lea Public Library
AARP/Blue Zones Vitality Project

References

External links

City of Albert Lea Official website

Cities in Minnesota
Cities in Freeborn County, Minnesota
County seats in Minnesota
Populated places established in 1855
1855 establishments in Minnesota Territory